Helene Hewitt  is a British climate scientist who is a research fellow at the Met Office. Her research considers climate and ocean models. Hewitt serves on the CLIVAR Ocean Model Development Panel. She was awarded an Order of the British Empire in the 2022 Birthday Honours.

Early life and education 
Hewitt is from Sidmouth. She grew up in Wombourne, Staffordshire, where she attended Ounsdale High School. She studied mathematics at the University of Cambridge, where she was a student at Fitzwilliam College. Hewitt was a doctoral researcher at the University of Southampton, where she studied the Western Equatorial Pacific Ocean. She worked on the World Ocean Circulation Experiment and at the Woods Hole Oceanographic Institution as a doctoral student.

Research and career 
In 1996, Hewitt joined the Met Office, where she has developed and assessed climate models. In 2003, Hewitt was made Head of Ocean and Sea Ice model development. Hewitt's model, HadGEM3, combined NEMO and CICE, computational models which simulate the movement of sea ice and ocean circulation.

Hewitt coordinated the IPCC Sixth Assessment Report on the Ocean, Cryosphere and Sea Level Change. She oversees the Ocean Modelling group at the Met Office Hadley Centre, where she develops global and shelf configurations for coupled predictions across multiple different timescales.

Hewitt was appointed an Order of the British Empire in the 2022 Birthday Honours.

Selected publications

References 

Living people
Year of birth missing (living people)
People from Sidmouth

Climatologists
Alumni of the University of Cambridge
Alumni of the University of Southampton
People from South Staffordshire District
Alumni of Fitzwilliam College, Cambridge